Armenia is underdeveloped in its waste management and recycling activities.  

According to the Statistical Committee of Armenia, organizations produced 55.2 million metric tons of waste in 2016, including mining waste. This amounts to about 18.5 tonnes per capita.

On May 4, 2018, the government modifications to relevant legislation aimed at strengthening the responsibility for proper waste management.

Landfills
Sixty landfills exist in Armenia. No waste sorting, recycling, or reuse takes place at any of them.

The Nubarashen landfill, located near Yerevan, is Armenia's largest waste disposal site. It receives almost all of the solid waste produced in the city of Yerevan and its suburbs, which is about 340 tons per day, or 102,000 tons per year.  The site has accumulated over 7.5 million tons of domestic waste over 50 years.

In 2018, a waste processing plant was scheduled for construction near Hrazdan city, which will allow for closure of 10 waste dumps.

Reuse and recycling

Starting May 2017 Innovative Solutions for Sustainable Development (ISSD) NGO is implementing waste management projects in Armenia ensuring the collection and recycling of Municipal Solid Waste in the involved communities. The biggest municipal solid waste management project of the NGO, "Recycle it," includes Yerevan, the capital city and has more than 500 partner organizations who recycle their waste within this project. The NGO organized more than 120 clean-ups and has more than 300,000 beneficiaries. 

In recent years there have been several attempts initiated by public activists to address the waste management problem, such as the Toprak Petq Chi campaign (2016), translates as "I don't need a plastic bag",' that targets single-use plastic bags.
 
Also recently, some recycling initiatives have started to take shape. Namely, Apaga, also known as ApagaCommunity CJSC, offers a paid pickup service, mirroring similar projects in more developed countries, though in these countries, recycling programs are taxpayer sponsored. Apaga enables individuals and organizations who take responsibility for their waste and want to participate, to voluntarily pay for a pickup service and get some rewards in return in the forms of discounts for individuals and green public relations (PR) for organizations. 

In order to allow everyone to benefit from recycling, Apaga has also implemented new Smart Recycling Containers called SmartApaga Containers where anyone with their personal, unique QR code can dispose of their plastics and get ApagaCoins (in-app currency) to exchange for rewards from their rewards partners.

Waste management in Yerevan 
The municipal government of Yerevan, capital of Armenia, has made attempts to solve the problem for the city with a long term development plan, which includes three main phases:
 In 2014, an international tender was announced for garbage collection. Two waste management companies were chosen: a Lebanese company called Sanitek, who later opened a operations branch in Yerevan; and two Armenian/Swedish Companies called Ecogroup and LL Miliconsult. 
 In 2016 the Armenian parliament ratified a loan agreement signed with the European Bank for Reconstruction and Development (EBRD), for an €8 million loan to finance the construction of a solid waste landfill in Yerevan that will comply with EU regulations.
 According to the municipal government of Yerevan, the next step is to introduce waste sorting and recycling practices with projects that meet European Union standards and regulations.

Notes

External links

Waste management by country
Economy of Armenia
Environment of Armenia